William Frame Conger (March 5, 1844November 17, 1918) was an American businessman and Republican politician from the state of Wisconsin. He was a member of the Wisconsin State Senate, representing Sauk and western Columbia counties in the 1895 and 1897 sessions.

Biography
William F. Conger was born in Bloomfield, New Jersey, in March 1844, and was raised and educated in the public schools in Bloomfield and New York City.

At age 18, he enlisted for service in the Union Army during the American Civil War and was enrolled in the 7th New York Infantry Regiment.  He served until the end of his term, in 1864, and then moved to the state of Wisconsin.  He remained only briefly before re-enlisting with a Wisconsin regiment, and was enrolled as a sergeant in the 42nd Wisconsin Infantry Regiment.  He remained with the 42nd Wisconsin Infantry until the end of the war and was acting sergeant major of the regiment for part of his service.

Back in Wisconsin, he worked as a clerk in Prairie du Sac until 1871, when he went into business as a wool dealer, which remained his primary occupation for the rest of his life.

Politically, Conger was a member of the Republican Party.  He was the Republican candidate for Wisconsin State Assembly in Sauk County's 1st Assembly district in 1890, but was defeated in the general election by Democrat Thomas William English.  He was then a delegate to the 1892 Republican National Convention, which re-nominated Benjamin Harrison.

In 1894, he ran again for state legislature as the Republican candidate for Wisconsin State Senate in the 27th State Senate district.  At the time, the district contained all of his native Sauk County as well as the western half of Columbia County.  In the general election, he defeated Democrat Evan W. Evans, receiving 55% of the vote.

Conger served in the 1895 and 1897 sessions of the Senate.  He sought renomination for another term in 1898 but faced an intense contest.  In the 1896 redistricting, his district had expanded to include all of Columbia County.  Due to the redistricting, the Republican Party organizations in Columbia and Sauk held separate nominating conventions for the 27th Senate district seat, with Sauk nominating Conger and Columbia nominating A. J. Turner.  The two delegations refused to compromise and choose a consensus nominee.  A lawsuit ensued, in which Wisconsin circuit judge Robert G. Siebecker ruled that both candidates were entitled to appear on the ballot.  With the court unable to resolve the dispute, a new convention was called for the delegates to choose a consensus nominee.  Conger and Turner, however, remained determined to deny the nomination to one another.  After a contentious debate and 100 ballots, the delegates eventually chose a compromise candidate—William G. Bissell—as their nominee.

After leaving office, he received an appointment as Rural Free Delivery inspector from the United States Postal Service, and was then promoted to superintendent for the southern division, working from the division headquarters in Nashville, Tennessee, for five years until resigning in 1906.

After retiring from federal employment, he returned to Prairie du Sac.  He became totally blind a year later, in 1907, after he mistakenly drank a flask of wood alcohol, which he had mistaken as medicine.  The anecdote about his blinding was widely reported around the state.

He subsequently moved to Pasadena, California, where he died in the fall of 1918.

Personal life and family
Conger married twice.  His first wife was Helen Garvin, with whom he had at least two sons.  After her death in 1899, he married Caroline "Carrie" Petway of Tennessee.

Electoral history

Wisconsin Assembly (1890)

| colspan="6" style="text-align:center;background-color: #e9e9e9;"| General Election, November 4, 1890

Wisconsin Senate (1894)

| colspan="6" style="text-align:center;background-color: #e9e9e9;"| General Election, November 6, 1894

References

External links
 

1844 births
1918 deaths
People from Bloomfield, New Jersey
People from Prairie du Sac, Wisconsin
Republican Party Wisconsin state senators
People of Wisconsin in the American Civil War
People of New York (state) in the American Civil War
Union Army soldiers
Burials in Wisconsin